Michael R. "Mike" Licona (born 1961) is an American New Testament scholar and author. He is Associate Professor in Theology at Houston Baptist University, Extraordinary Associate Professor of Theology at North-West University and the director of Risen Jesus, Inc. Licona specializes in the Resurrection of Jesus, and in the literary analysis of the Gospels as Greco-Roman biographies.

Biography
Licona was raised in a Christian family. When he entered Liberty University, he planned to become a musician and obtained a bachelor's degree in music performance (saxophone).

Licona has a M.A. in religious studies from Liberty University and a Ph.D. in New Testament studies from the University of Pretoria. He served as an apologetics coordinator at the North American Mission Board (Southern Baptist Convention) from 2005 through 2011, when he resigned as a result of the controversy surrounding his book The Resurrection of Jesus: A New Historiographical Approach, which was otherwise well received. Licona has lectured on more than 100 university campuses and has appeared on television and radio programs.

Since 2012, Licona has been Associate Professor of Theology at Houston Baptist University and since 2014 he has been Extraordinary Associate Professor of Theology at North-West University.

Academic career
Licona's book The Resurrection of Jesus: A New Historiographical Approach seeks to prove Jesus's bodily resurrection, and was praised for "the painstaking care" with which Licona researched his topic. It also led to Licona's departure from Southern Evangelical Seminary.

In a passage in his book, Licona questioned the literal interpretation of the story of the resurrection of the saints in Matthew 27, suggesting the possibility that it might be apocalyptic imagery. This led to evangelicals Norman Geisler and Albert Mohler accusing Licona of denying the full inerrancy of the Bible in general and the Gospel narratives in particular.  Licona maintained that the interpretation he proposed had nothing to do with whether the Gospels are inerrant but was a matter of how to interpret it as Matthew had intended (i.e., hermeneutics).  In the course of events, Licona resigned in 2011 from his position as research professor at Southern Evangelical Seminary and as apologetics coordinator for the North American Mission Board (NAMB). Other evangelical scholars such as William Lane Craig, J.P. Moreland, and Gary Habermas voiced their support for Licona by signing an open letter to Geisler. Michael F. Bird likewise supported Licona. The Southeastern Theological Review devoted their Summer 2012 issue to discussions on Licona's book (edited by Heath Thomas and Robert Stewart), including reviews by Gary Habermas, Timothy McGrew, and C. Behan McCullagh. It also included a virtual roundtable discussion with participants Heath Thomas, Michael Licona, Craig Blomberg, Paul Copan, Charles Quarles, Michael Kruger and Daniel Akin.

In the course of the controversy over the raised saints in the Gospel of Matthew, Evangelicals such as Norman Geisler, Albert Mohler and F. David Farnell have questioned whether Licona is moving away from his evangelical views and is headed in a similar path traveled by the agnostic New Testament scholar Bart Ehrman.  While asserting his belief in the divine authority of the Bible and its inerrancy, he maintains he cannot presuppose these beliefs while engaged in historical research. He also claims the doctrine of biblical inerrancy is not a doctrine fundamental to the Christian faith. In a radio exchange with Ehrman, Licona said that if Jesus actually rose from the dead, Christianity is true even if it were also true that some things in the Bible were not. Licona noted what he saw as several problems with the argument for inerrancy provided by Norman Geisler.

Licona has often debated Bart D. Ehrman over his positions about Jesus and his resurrection. Despite this, the two are personally friends and Licona has published articles as a guest on Ehrman's blog.

Works

Thesis

Books

As editor

References

External links
 Mike Licona's website
 Interview with Nick Peters Licona discusses Plutarch's Lives and how they relate to scholarship regarding the Gospels.

1961 births
Living people
American biblical scholars
Christian apologists
Christian writers
Critics of Mormonism
Critics of Jehovah's Witnesses
American evangelicals
University of Pretoria alumni
Writers from Baltimore
Liberty University alumni
People from Cumming, Georgia
New Testament scholars
21st-century American historians
21st-century American male writers
Critics of atheism
Historians from Georgia (U.S. state)
Historians from Maryland
American male non-fiction writers